Bosnia and Herzegovina–Russia relations are the bilateral relations between the two countries, Bosnia and Herzegovina and Russia. Bosnia is one of the countries where Russia has contributed troops for the NATO-led stabilization force. Russia recognized the independence of Bosnia and Herzegovina on 27 April 1992.

History
At the beginning of 12 January 1996, Russia had sent troops in Sarajevo, the capital of Bosnia and Herzegovina,  via Tuzla. The move was motivated, in part, by the desire to improve relations with the United States. Location of Russian troops deployment became subject of an international debate: The Russians wanted to be deployed in the Bosnian Serb territory, and the U.S. wanted them deployed in Bosnian Croat territory. During the 1999 Kosovo events, the 1996 agreement on joint operations in Bosnia was cited as an example of successful Russia-NATO cooperation.

Russian position on post-war reconstruction of Bosnia remains, as at 2008, in line with the Western policy. In particular, in October 2007 Russia upheld the Western denial of ethnic voting (defended by the Serbian minority and the government of Serbia).

During the 2022 Russian invasion of Ukraine, Igor Kalabukhov, Russia’s ambassador to Bosnia and Herzegovina, said that Russia would “react” if Bosnia decides to join NATO, in an apparent reference to using military force.

Resident diplomatic missions
 Bosnia and Herzegovina has an embassy in Moscow.
 Russia has an embassy in Sarajevo.

See also

 Foreign relations of Bosnia and Herzegovina
 Foreign relations of Russia

References

External links

 
Russia
Bilateral relations of Russia